David Harris may refer to:

Academics and literature 
 David Harris (activist) (1946–2023), American author, journalist and anti-war activist
 Dovid Harris (born 1945), American dean of the Rabbinical Seminary of America / Yeshiva Rabbi Israel Meir Hacohen (Chofetz Chaim)
 David R. Harris (geographer) (1930–2013), British academic geographer, anthropologist and archaeologist
 David R. Harris (sociologist), American sociologist, president of Union College, provost of Tufts University and former dean of Cornell University
 David W. Harris (1948–1994), Canadian experimental poet

Entertainment 
 Dave Harris (born 1971), American disc jockey, songwriter and musician
 David Harris (American actor) (born 1959), American actor
 David Harris (Australian actor) (born 1975), Australian actor and singer
 David Ryan Harris (born 1968), American singer-songwriter

Politics and government 
 David B. Harris, Canadian former Security Intelligence Service planner and terrorism consultant
 David Bullock Harris (1814–1864), American Confederate States Army colonel during the American Civil War
 David Harris (Illinois politician) (born 1948), American former Adjutant General of Illinois (1999–2003) and member of the Illinois House of Representatives (1983–1993 and 2011–2019)
 David Courtenay Harris, Dominican judge on the Eastern Caribbean Supreme Court
 David Harris (advocate) (born 1949), American Executive Director of the American Jewish Committee
 David Harris (Australian politician) (born 1966), Australian member of the New South Wales Legislative Assembly
 David Harris (British politician) (born 1937), British Conservative MP
 David Harris (MP for Bristol) (died 1582), British MP for Bristol
 K. David Harris, American former justice of Iowa Supreme Court

Sports 
 Dave Harris (baseball) (1900–1973), American baseball player
 David Harris (American football) (born 1984), American linebacker
 David Harris (South Australia cricketer) (1930–2007), Australian cricketer
 David Harris (Victoria cricketer) (born 1966), Australian cricketer
 David Harris (Australian footballer) (born 1946), Australian rules footballer
 David Harris (English cricketer) (1755–1803), British cricketer
 David Harris (footballer, born 1953), English footballer
 David Harris (rugby) (1879–1958), British rugby union and rugby league football player
 David Harris (rugby league), Australian rugby football player on the list of Cronulla-Sutherland Sharks players
 David Harris (umpire), Australian Australian rules football umpire

Others 
 David Harris (mason), American Welsh born stonemason in 1800s Iowa, United States
 David Harris (software developer) (born 1961), New Zealand software developer
 David Lynn Harris, American orthodontist who was murdered in 2002 by his wife
 David A. Harris Jr., United States Air Force general
 David Ray Harris, American criminal and murderer featured in the 1988 film The Thin Blue Line